The Nandi Escarpment is an escarpment in Nandi County, Kenya. It marks the boundary between Kisumu and Nandi counties. It consists of numerous massive geological rocks ,one being Nandi rock. Monkeys and baboons are among common wildlife sightings.

Location

The escarpment lies on the border between Kakamega County and Nandi County.
It defines the western edge of the central highlands of Kenya.
The escarpment lies between the North Nandi Forest to the east and the Kakamega Forest to the west.
To the west the Kakamega Forest, a mid-altitude tropical rainforest, lies below the escarpment in the Lake Victoria catchment.

Description

The rugged terrain includes granite and volcanic rock.
The Köppen climate classification is Am : Tropical monsoon climate.
The Yala River rises below the escarpment.

The scarp marks the boundary between the Nandi people to the east and the Luhya people to the west.
The  Sheu Morobi cliffs in the escarpment used to be used by old Nandi people to commit suicide so their family did not have to care for them.
This was considered an honorable action, and would follow special rituals and a last meal.
The name means "there we go forever".

Notes

Sources

Escarpments of Kenya